Nick Jr. is an American morning programming block that airs on Nickelodeon (specifically for weekday mornings, and often shortened on holidays and weekends). It was launched on January 4, 1988. Nick Jr. features a lineup of shows aimed at children under six.

In 2009, Nickelodeon launched a separate channel named after the Nick Jr. block. To differentiate the two services, the channel is known on air as the "Nick Jr. Channel."

History

Early years (1988–1993)
Since its launch on April 1, 1979, and throughout the 1980s, Nickelodeon aired programs for preschoolers (most prominently Pinwheel and Today's Special) on weekdays (from 8:00 am – 2:00 pm) and weekend mornings. A new rebrand for the block that abbreviated its name to Nick Jr. was gradually unveiled between September 1988 and mid-1989. Nick Jr.'s new logo was orange for 'Nick' and blue for 'Jr.', and it varied in the shape or species (e.g.: two gears, trains, robots, planets, insects, comets, or elephants). Like with Nickelodeon, Nick Jr.'s network IDs featured the block's logo in different shapes and styles. At launch, the block aired from 8:30 am – 2:30 pm. On weekends, preschool programs went unbranded and aired at earlier hours of the day.

Until June 29, 1990, Pinwheel was featured, originally for three hours (two in the morning and one at noon), then for one hour starting in Spring 1989. When Nick Jr.'s original series Eureeka's Castle premiered in September, Pinwheel was split into two separate half hours in the morning and afternoon, where it remained until June 29, 1990, after which the block was truncated to start at 9:30 am. Much of Nick Jr.'s other programs at the time were of Japanese or foreign origin (including Fred Penner's Place, Sharon, Lois & Bram's Elephant Show, Adventures of the Little Koala, Noozles, Maya the Bee, and The Littl' Bits).

Grow, Learn, and Play (1993–1994)

On , Nick Jr. premiered a new series, Cappelli & Company, and received a new rebrand which prominently featured a new Nick Jr. logo consisting of an orange parent and a blue child, and the slogan Grow, Learn, and Play. The block's timing was solidified as 9:00am - 2:00 pm. Several Nick Jr. promos and bumpers featured kids playing near the Nick Jr. logo and a theme song with the slogan sung to the melody of London Bridge, and a few featured Cappelli & Company mascot Frank Cappelli. Nick Jr. also started using a female announcer (who was replaced by a different one in 1994, 1998 and 2003) in its promos and bumpers. Nick Jr. began to invest more into producing original interstitial series (including 1994's Muppet Time, forty two-minute shorts from The Jim Henson Company) in order to stay within a self-imposed limit of five minutes of commercials per hour. 

On April 4, 1994, the "Jim Henson's Muppet Hour" sub-block was created by pairing Muppet Babies reruns with the new acquisition The Muppet Show. Due to Nick Jr.'s declining ratings as well as competition from PTV from PBS and Ready Set Learn from TLC, Nickelodeon spent $30 million revamping the Nick Jr. block over the next three years. On June 13, older-skewing Nickelodeon series Rugrats, The Alvin Show, Dennis the Menace, and Lassie joined Nick Jr.'s lineup, as the block's branding was temporarily de-emphasized in favor of regular Nickelodeon branding until September 2.

Just for Me/Play to Learn (1994–2003)
On , Nick Jr. rebranded and introduced Face, an animated mascot that introduced shows and interstitials and led into commercial breaks. In the context of his segments, Face was capable of materializing objects such as an astronaut, a robot, a clown, a window, a traffic light, stars, and even wood. He was also capable of creating a number of foley sound effects and voices including an iconic signature three-note trumpet noise usually following the name "Nick Jr." at the end of almost every bumper. Also, he changed colors, moods, and feelings. Face was voiced by Chris Phillips, who also narrated several Nickelodeon and Nick Jr. promos. The original Face promos were produced by Nick Digital (from 1994 to 1996 and from 2000 to 2003; the later promos featured a redesigned Face) and DMA Animation (from 1996 to 2000). On October 24, Nick Jr. premiered two new original series, Gullah Gullah Island and Allegra's Window, resulting in 50% rating gains for the block.

In 1995, Nick Jr. acquired broadcast rights to The Busy World of Richard Scarry from sister network Showtime, and later premiered Rupert on September 11, and Little Bear on November 6 (both were produced by the Canadian animation studio Nelvana). 

On , the first episode of Blue's Clues premiered in primetime on Nick at Nite, then aired on Nick Jr. the next day. Nick Jr. also premiered four new interstitial series and received a new rebrand produced by Pittard Sullivan. Blue's Clues quickly deposed Gullah Gullah Island as Nick Jr.'s most popular series. Rugrats was pushed out of Nick Jr.'s lineup after May 2, 1997 to make room for second showings of Little Bear and Blue's Clues. On March 16, 1998, the "nickjr.com" website was launched. Later that year, Nick Jr. rebranded again and introduced the "Just for Me" slogan.

In Q1 1999, Nick Jr. premiered three new series based on books, Franklin on January 11, Kipper on February 8, and Maisy on the 11 of the same month, which helped increase the block's ratings. Later in 1999, Little Bill premiered on November 28; the series' first episodes premiered on Nickelodeon Sunday nights before airing on Nick Jr. the next day. Nick Jr. briefly aired reruns of Shining Time Station on June 5, 2000 (Maggie and the Ferocious Beast premiered on the same day that show premiered) to promote the film, Thomas and the Magic Railroad, before replacing it with Dora the Explorer on August 14, which became one of Nick Jr.'s most successful series.

The US dub of Bob the Builder premiered on Nick Jr. on January 13, 2001, and Oswald premiered on August 20. On , Nick Jr. received a new rebrand produced by AdamsMorioka (who had previously rebranded Nickelodeon and Nick at Nite) and Editional Effects, intended to have a greater appeal towards parents. In the spring of 2002, Nick Jr. altered the format of its commercial breaks, resulting in the removal of network IDs dating back to 1994. On April 7, 2003, the day sister network Noggin rebranded and introduced Moose and Zee, Nick Jr. aired Noggin's three new original series Oobi, Tweenies, and Miffy and Friends; Nick Jr. continued to air Tweenies from July to September 25.

On August 29, 2003, the original Face interstitials ended their almost 9-year run.

Play Along (2003–2004)
On , Nick Jr. received a rebrand that introduced more than a dozen new logos; British program Rubbadubbers premiered the next day. A new interstitial series called Nick Jr. Play Along was introduced, hosted by two fun live-action mascots: Robin (played by actress Hillary Hawkins) and Zack (played by actor Travis Guba). Along with Robin and Zack were two sock puppets called the Feetbeats. Face was given a brand new look which added eyebrows and a chin and straightened his eyes by inverting their colors from white dots on black eyes to actual-looking eyes, and was voiced by Nick on CBS announcer Babi Floyd. The new Face promos were produced by Vee-Pee Cartoons.

Nick Jr. removed the Play Along interstitials aside from a re-edited opening in February 2004.

On October 8, 2004, the new Face interstitials and most of Nick Jr.'s other interstitial series ended their 1-year run.

Love to Play! (2004–2007)
On , Nick Jr. received another rebrand containing interstitials co-produced by Little Airplane Productions featuring the block's new mascot Piper O'Possum (voiced by Ali Brustofski and created by Josh Selig), and the new slogan "Love to Play!". Nick Jr.'s female announcer was replaced with Kobie Powell and Chris Phillips. Nick Jr. used its new on-screen bug to promote its website until , when the FCC forbaded that. LazyTown, Miss Spider's Sunny Patch Friends, and The Backyardigans (the latter of which premiering alongside the rebrand) premiered on Nick Jr. in 2004; they were briefly shown on Noggin during Thanksgiving week before joining Noggin's regular schedule later. Between 2004 and 2007, Nick Jr. reduced its reliance on interstitial series and increased the amount of commercials it aired.

On November 10, 2006, the SpongeBob SquarePants "Best Day Ever" marathon on Nickelodeon pre-empted the Nick Jr. block.

On September 7, 2007, the Piper O'Possum interstitials ended their almost 3-year run.

Play with Us (2007–2009)
On , Nick Jr. received yet another rebrand. A new slogan,  Play with Us!, was included. Nick Jr.'s bumpers encouraged preschoolers to play along and featured the Nick Jr. logo in the form of two stop-motion stuffed animals. This marks the first time that Nick Jr. had no mascot since 1994.

On January 30, 2009, the original Nick Jr. block ended its 21-year run with Ni Hao, Kai-Lan being its last show. That same day, the Play with Us! interstitials ended their almost 2-year run.

Nickelodeon rebranding (2009–2014)

On , the original Nick Jr. block rebranded as Nickelodeon’s Play Date. The block's branding was based on Noggin's branding, and many bumpers featured drawings, finger puppets or cupcakes. The bumpers' music was a choir of kids vocalizing, and Nicolette Pierini was the announcer of each bumper. With this new branding, their Nick Jr. graphic bugs have been replaced with the bug used for regular Nickelodeon programing. Despite now being known as Nickelodeon's Play Date, some bumpers still contained the Nick Jr. stop motion animal bumpers from the previous branding, but only until May, when they have been removed, remade to have the Nickelodeon logo. From February 2 to early June of that same year, Nickelodeon’s Play Date used the Nick Jr. split-screen credits from 2007, only with the Nickelodeon splat logo in place. Starting in June of that year, the split-screen credits were changed to match the branding. On September 28 of that year, the Nick Jr. channel was launched replacing Noggin. That same day, the block became simply known as Nick’s Play Date. Starting in the summer of 2010, the block started to air at 7:00 am.

In 2011, Nick’s Play Date received a new rebrand featuring characters from the block's shows. That same year, Nick’s Play Date stopped using the branding’s split-screen credits, and started using Nickelodeon’s split-screen credits template. The following year, the Play Date branding was replaced with a modified version of the Nick Jr. channel's new branding known as Nick: The Smart Place to Play. Despite Nickelodeon displaying its shows credits during the last 30 seconds before it since 2012, the branding retained the split-screen credits for Nick Jr. shows airing on the block until .

Return of Nick Jr. branding (2014–present)
On , Nick: The Smart Place to Play rebranded back to Nick Jr. while still using the Nickelodeon name for the screen bug. When aired on the Nick Jr. channel, commercials for programs broadcast on Nickelodeon's Nick Jr. block usually end with "Only on Nick" or "Only on Nickelodeon" to differentiate the titles. On the same day, the Nick Jr. block also began to use Nickelodeon's on-screen credits to include more commercials (now 12 minutes per hour). On , the Nick Jr. website was fully redesigned to match up with the Nick Jr. app.

On , the Nick Jr. block began calling itself "Nick Jr. on Nick", refreshing its imaging with new bumpers and curriculum boards. On November 12 of that same year, the block reverted to using the Nickelodeon name for the screen bug and later in advertisements, phasing out of the Nick Jr. name once again since 2009. However, the Nick Jr. name is retained in the refreshed bumpers and curriculum boards. Starting in the fall of 2020, the block started to air at 7:00 am once again for the first time since 2010. As of fall 2022, the Nick Jr. block has been extended to sign off at 3:00 pm, but by January 2, 2023, it reverted to having a 2 p.m. sign off time.

Programming

Other Nick Jr. blocks for broadcast networks
From 2000 to 2002 and from 2004 to 2006, Nick Jr. programs and interstitial segments appeared as a Saturday morning block on CBS entitled  Nick Jr. on CBS. From 2002 to 2004, it was part of the general Nick on CBS block, which also included programming from the main Nickelodeon channel. It ended after Viacom and CBS Corporation were separated at the start at 2006 (but re-merged in later years) and was replaced by the KOL Secret Slumber Party block on September 16, 2006.
From 2003 to 2009 there was also a Nick Jr. on Noggin that aired shows including Bob the Builder, Gullah Gullah Island, Dora the Explorer, Blue's Clues, Maggie and the Ferocious Beast, and Little Bear. In late 2004 and 2005, it got these shows: Miss Spider's Sunny Patch Friends, The Backyardigans, LazyTown, and Go, Diego, Go!

Spanish-language US network Telemundo has aired Blue's Clues (Spanish Pista De Blues) (from 1998 to 2000, as part of the Nickelodeon en Telemundo block) and Dora the Explorer (Spanish Dora la Exploradora) (from 2005 to 2006, as part of the Telemundo Kids block) in Spanish. On April 5, 2008, competing Spanish network Univision added Spanish-dubbed versions of Dora the Explorer and its spin-off Go, Diego, Go! to their Saturday morning Planeta U line-up. A Spanish-dubbed version of The Backyardigans was later added to the lineup on January 8, 2011.

For a brief time in summer 2010, Tr3s, a sister network to Nickelodeon, aired a daily block of Spanish-dubbed Nick Jr. programs under the name Tr3s Jr. to meet E/I requirements for its broadcast affiliates. Shows like Pistas de Blue (the Spanish version of Blue's Clues) and Wonder Pets! were featured in the block.

Face's reappearances
Face (1990s) made an appearance during the 2012 New Year edition of The '90s Are All That, TeenNick's former 1990s-oriented late-night block. Face's appearances consisted of out-of-context clips that make him appear to be drunk or making adult comments (e.g.: "Yeah, grow a pair!").

In October 2015 for the Halloween/Nick or Treat season, the "Face the Monster" bumper would play on the block as a transition of introducing episodes of Aaahh!!! Real Monsters. The same bumper would be used on the block as an April Fools' Day prank on April 1, 2017.

Face also appeared in an Easter promo for The Splat, The '90s Are All That's successor, in 2016, encouraging viewers to look for the Easter bunny in 1990s Nickelodeon shows.

See also
 Dance and Sing! The Best of Nick Jr.
 Nick Jr. (channel)
 Nickelodeon

References

External links

Block
Block
Nickelodeon programming blocks
Children's television networks in the United States
Preschool education television networks
Television programming blocks in the United States